Jane Toshiko Nishida (born April 26, 1955) is an American lawyer and government official. She serves as the assistant administrator in the Office of International and Tribal Affairs of the U.S. Environmental Protection Agency. Nishida served as the Acting Administrator of the Environmental Protection Agency from January 20, 2021 to March 11, 2021.

Life 
Nishida was born in Bethesda, Maryland on April 26, 1955. She earned a B.A. in international relations from Lewis & Clark College in 1977, and a J.D. from Georgetown University Law Center in 1980. 

Nishida was a counsel in the Maryland General Assembly during 1981–1984, and then worked in the Governor's Legislative Office until 1991. She was then the Executive Director of the Chesapeake Bay Foundation during 1991–1995.  Nishida was Maryland Secretary of the Environment from March 27, 1995 to April 26, 2002. Nishida then became a senior environmental specialist at The World Bank. She began working for the EPA in 2011.

References

External links 
 

1955 births
20th-century American women lawyers
20th-century American lawyers
21st-century American women lawyers
21st-century American lawyers
Administrators of the United States Environmental Protection Agency
Biden administration cabinet members
American environmental lawyers
Georgetown University Law Center alumni
Lewis & Clark College alumni
Living people
People from Bethesda, Maryland
State cabinet secretaries of Maryland
Women government officials
World Bank people